Sobotín is a municipality and village in Šumperk District in the Olomouc Region of the Czech Republic. It has about 1,100 inhabitants.

Administrative parts
Villages of Klepáčov and Rudoltice are administrative parts of Sobotín.

Geography
It lies mostly in the Hanušovice Highlands.

History
The first written mention of Sobotín is from 1351. The history of Sobotín is connected with the iron ore mining in the area.

In 1844, the Klein family came into the village and had the local industrial building rebuilt into a castle. This family of German businesspeople was very active in the life of the municipality. They were expelled after World War II together with the German population of the municipality.

On 1 January 2010, the new municipality of Petrov nad Desnou (including the village of Petrov nad Desnou and the settlement of Terezín) separated from Sobotín.

Sights
The historic landmarks of Sobotín are the Klein family mausoleum and the Sobotín Castle. The mausoleum, built in 1885, was inspired by the work of the Italian Renaissance architect Andrea Palladio. The castle was built after 1844 and adjacent lands were transformed into a nature park in which exotic trees were planted. Today the castle serves as a hotel.

Gallery

References

External links

Villages in Šumperk District